Dryocochlias is a genus of small, air-breathing land snails, terrestrial pulmonate gastropod mollusks in the subfamily Helicostylinae of the family Camaenidae.

Species
 Dryocochlias butleri (L. Pfeiffer, 1842)
 Dryocochlias lacera  (L. Pfeiffer, 1854)
 Dryocochlias languida (L. Pfeiffer, 1843)
 Dryocochlias metaformis (Férussac, 1821)
 Dryocochlias rehbeini (L. Pfeiffer, 1852)
 Dryocochlias unica (L. Pfeiffer, 1843)

References

 Bank, R. A. (2017). Classification of the Recent terrestrial Gastropoda of the World. Last update: July 16, 2017
 Schileyko, A. A. (2004). Treatise on Recent terrestrial pulmonate molluscs. Part 12. Bradybaenidae, Monadeniidae, Xanthonychidae, Epiphragmophoridae, Helmintoglyptidae, Elonidae, Humboldtianidae, Spincterochilidae, Cochlicellidae. Ruthenica. Supplement 2: 1627-1763. Moskva

External links
 O. F. von. (1898). Verzeichnis der auf den Philippinen lebenden Landmollusken. Abhandlungen der Naturforschenden Gesellschaft zu Görlitz. 22: 26-208.,

Camaenidae